"Feel Something" is a single by American DJ Illenium, Canadian producer Excision and American metalcore band I Prevail. It was released on April 3, 2020 via Astralwerks.

Background
In July 2019, Illenium and Excision were working on a then-untitled single in the studio, and then in September of the same year they debuted "Feel Something" during a back-to-back set at Lost Lands.

Composition
EDM said that the song "incorporates both artists' soft and heavy sides".

Lyric video
The lyric video was published on April 3, 2020, and featured Illenium as a phoenix and Excision as a dinosaur.

Charts

Weekly charts

Year-end charts

References

2020 songs
2020 singles
Illenium songs
Dubstep songs
Songs written by David Pramik
Songs written by Illenium
I Prevail songs